Jeremy Tiang (born 17 January 1977) is a Singaporean writer, translator and playwright based in New York City. Tiang won the 2018 Singapore Literature Prize for English fiction for his debut novel, State of Emergency, published in 2017.

Career
In 2009, Tiang won the National Arts Council's Golden Point Award for English fiction for his story Trondheim.

In 2016, his short story collection It Never Rains on National Day was shortlisted for the Singapore Literature Prize.

In 2010, Tiang's idea for his first novel, titled State of Emergency qualified for a grant by the National Arts Council. Under the Creation Grant Scheme, he would receive a total of $12,000. It took him seven years to write the novel but when he submitted the first draft to the council in 2016, the remainder of the grant was withdrawn – he had received $8,600 by then. At that time, Tiang was shocked as he was writing full-time and any additional money would be useful but decided to keep writing. His manuscript was subsequently shortlisted for the 2016 Epigram Books Fiction Prize where he received a cash prize of $5,000.

In 2018, he won the Singapore Literature Prize for English fiction for his debut novel State of Emergency (2017). The Singapore Book Council which established and managed the Singapore Literature Prize said that Tiang's win was a "unanimous decision" by the judges.

Bibliography

Short story
Trondheim

Short story collections
It Never Rains on National Day (2015)

Novels
State of Emergency (2017)

Translation work
The Promise Bird – novel by Zhang Yueran
Ten Loves – short story collection by Zhang Yueran
Durians Are Not the Only Fruit – essays by Wong Yoon Wah
Island of Silence – novel by Su Wei-Chen
Unrest 《騷動》– 2002 Chinese novel by Singaporean Yeng Pway Ngon
The Borrowed – Hong Kong detective novel by Chan Ho-Kei
Never Grow Up – memoir by Jackie Chan (Simon & Schuster, 2018)
Coloratura – novel by Li Er (OU Press, 2019)
Second Sister – Hong Kong detective novel by Chan Ho-Kei (Grove Atlantic, 2020)
Strange Beasts of China by Yan Ge (Tilted Axis Press, 2020), (Melville House, 2021)

References

External links
 

1977 births
Living people
Singaporean writers
Chinese–English translators
Translators to English
Translators from Chinese
Literary translators